The 1993 Munster Senior Hurling Championship Final was a hurling match played on Sunday 4 July 1993 at the Gaelic Grounds in Limerick. It was contested by Tipperary and Clare. Tipperary captained by Michael O'Meara and managed by "Babs" Keating won the game by 3-27 to 2-12. Tipperary played the game in yellow jerseys with Clare wearing blue jerseys.		
 
The match has become known for the moment when Nicky English smiled after scoring a point for Tipperary late in the second half. Clare accused him of laughing at them as Tipperary ran out easy winners. English denied that he had laughed and that it was just an innocent smile to Declan Ryan who had delayed the initial pass to him.

See also
 Clare–Tipperary hurling rivalry

References

External links
Match Highlights

Munster
Munster Senior Hurling Championship Finals
Clare county hurling team matches
Tipperary county hurling team matches